In statistics, asymptotic theory, or large sample theory, is a framework for assessing properties of estimators and statistical tests. In practice, a limit evaluation is considered to be approximately valid for large finite sample sizes too.

Overview
Most statistical problems begin with a dataset of size . The asymptotic theory proceeds by assuming that it is possible (in principle) to keep collecting additional data, thus that the sample size grows infinitely, i.e. . Under the assumption, many results can be obtained that are unavailable for samples of finite size. An example is the weak law of large numbers.

For some statistical models, slightly different approaches of asymptotics may be used.

Besides the standard approach to asymptotics, other alternative approaches exist:
This approach lets us study the regularity of estimators.
This approach is especially popular for the unit root tests.
 In kernel density estimation and kernel regression, an additional parameter is assumed—the bandwidth . The rate of convergence must be chosen carefully, though, usually .

In many cases, highly accurate results for finite samples can be obtained via numerical methods (i.e. computers); even in such cases, though, asymptotic analysis can be useful.

Modes of convergence of random variables

Asymptotic properties

Estimators

Consistency
A sequence of estimates is said to be consistent, if it converges in probability to the true value of the parameter being estimated:
 
That is, roughly speaking with an infinite amount of data the estimator (the formula for generating the estimates) would almost surely give the correct result for the parameter being estimated.

Asymptotic distribution
If it is possible to find sequences of non-random constants }, } (possibly depending on the value of ), and a non-degenerate distribution  such that
 
then the sequence of estimators  is said to have the asymptotic distribution G.

Asymptotic confidence regions

Asymptotic theorems
 Central limit theorem
 Continuous mapping theorem 
 Glivenko–Cantelli theorem
 Law of large numbers
 Law of the iterated logarithm
 Slutsky's theorem
 Delta method

See also
Asymptotic analysis 
Exact statistics
Large deviations theory

References

Bibliography